An archetypal name is a proper name of a real person or mythological or fictional character that has become a designation for an archetype of a certain personal trait. It is a form of antonomasia.

Archetypal names are a literary device used to allude to certain traits of a character or a plot.

Literary critic Egil Törnqvist mentions possible risks in choosing certain names for literary characters. For example, if a person is named Abraham, it is uncertain whether the reader will be hinted of the biblical figure or Abraham Lincoln, and only the context provides the proper understanding.

Archetypal names for persons
Nanook, an Eskimo
Tex, a cowboy
Hanako, an archetypal Japanese name for girls.

Archetypal names for groups
A name may also be an identifier of a social group, an ethnicity, nationality, or geographical locality.

Some of the names below may also be used as ethnic slurs.

Karen, mainly used in the US for an entitled and demanding white woman
Paddy, for an Irishman: from Saint Patrick, the patron of Ireland

Archetypal names for traits

Real persons
 Genius: Einstein
 Womanizer: Casanova
 Traitor: Benedict Arnold, Quisling
 Betrayer: Judas, Brutus
 Outstanding ability: Bradmanesque

Fictional or mythological characters
 Handsome man: Adonis
 Lover: Romeo
 Manipulator: Svengali
 Womanizer: Don Giovanni / Don Juan, Lothario

See also
Stock character
Placeholder name
Eponym
:Category:National personifications
List of eponyms

References

Names
Archetypes